Qarahchi-ye Olya (also Romanized as Qarahchī-ye ‘Olyā; also known as Qarahchī-ye Bālā) is a village in Arshaq-e Shomali Rural District, Arshaq District, Meshgin Shahr County, Ardabil Province, Iran. At the 2006 census, its population was 306, in 70 families.

References 

Towns and villages in Meshgin Shahr County